Štěpánkovice is a municipality and village in Opava District in the Moravian-Silesian Region of the Czech Republic. It has about 3,200 inhabitants. It is part of the historic Hlučín Region.

Administrative parts
Villages of Bílá Bříza and Svoboda are administrative parts of Štěpánkovice.

History
The first written mention of Štěpánkovice is from 1265. Until 1742, the village belonged to Duchy of Troppau. Since 1742, it belonged to Prussia after Maria Theresa had been defeated.

Notable people
Filip Souček (born 2000), footballer

References

External links

Villages in Opava District
Hlučín Region